Krymskaya is a passenger station on the Moscow Central Circle, located on the 31st kilometer of the Little Ring of Moscow Railway. It's integrated with Moscow Metro by fare control system and serviced by cooperation of Moscow Metro and Russian Railways.

Gallery

External links 

 Крымская mkzd.ru

Moscow Metro stations
Railway stations in Russia opened in 2016
Moscow Central Circle stations